Devin Terrell Clark (born April 12, 1990) is an American mixed martial artist currently competing in the Light heavyweight division of the Ultimate Fighting Championship. A professional competitor since 2010, he was signed by Ultimate Fighting Championship (UFC) after Dana White scouted him on the "Dana White: Looking for a Fight - Season 1 Episode 6" UFC web series.

Background
Clark was born in Sioux Falls, South Dakota in 1990. He started boxing as a child and wrestling at the age of seven, continuing to compete in the latter in high school. He started coming into his own as a junior in high school, where in the state finals match, he lost to former UFC athlete David Michaud. The following year, his senior year, he became the South Dakota State Champion at 189 lbs. Clark attended Rochester Community and Technical College where he was a two-time NJCAA All-American at the 184-pounds division for the Yellowjackets. He won the National Championship in 2009, and placed 4th in 2010.

Despite eventually dropping out of college, Clark wasn't ready to stop competing as a martial artist, so Clark started MMA training at his local gym, Team Nak Suk, and later moved to Next Edge Academy under the tutelage of BJJ black belt Bruce Hoyer. He quickly moved up and competed in the Resurrection Fighting Alliance. He was a high school state wrestling champion, Junior College National wrestling champion, and an amateur boxer.

Mixed martial arts career

Early career

Clark started his professional MMA career on August 24, 2013, and made his debut in Knockout Events: Battle at the Chip. He had his first win over Jeremy Spelts via TKO (punches) on round one.

One year later, after his first professional win, he made a move to compete in Resurrection Fighting Alliance 17 on August 22, 2014. He faced Aaron Brown and secured a win via TKO (punches) on round two.

On February 7, 2015, Clark joined Total Fight Challenge promotion for his third fight and faced William Vincent. He secured a win via submission (rear-naked choke).

Clark returned to Resurrection Fighting Alliance promotion (RFA). He faced Jaquis William on RFA 25 on April 10, 2015, outworked William and won the fight via unanimous decision.

Clark faced Dervin Lopez on RFA 29: USA vs Brazil on August 21, 2015. He won the fight via unanimous decision.

On April 15, 2016 Dana White, Matt Serra and Robbie Lawler attended Resurrection Fighting Alliance 39 event at Sioux Falls, South Dakota for "Dana White  Looking For a Fighter", a UFC web series program, where Clark faced Rafael Viana for the Light heavyweight Championship. The fight was scheduled for 5 rounds and after the second round, Viana suffered a broken hand which kept him from continuing in the fight.  Clark was declared the new champion. White was impressed with Clark's performance on the night and with his MMA record of 6-0-0, White signed him up into the UFC roster.

Ultimate Fighting Championship
Clark made his UFC debut against Alex Nicholson in a middleweight bout on July 13, 2016, at UFC Fight Night 91. He lost the fight via knockout in the first round.

Clark, replacing Jake Collier, moved back to light heavyweight division and faced Josh Stansbury on December 3, 2016, at The Ultimate Fighter 24 Finale. He won the fight via unanimous decision.

Clark next faced Jake Collier on April 15, 2017, at UFC on Fox 24. He won the fight via unanimous decision. In post fight interviews, Clark admitted that he was disappointed in his performance as he stated he missed opportunities to finish the fight.

Clark faced Jan Błachowicz on October 21, 2017, at UFC Fight Night 118. He lost the fight via rear-naked choke submission in the second round.

Clark faced Mike Rodríguez on April 7, 2018, at UFC 223. He won the fight by unanimous decision.

Clark faced Aleksandar Rakić on December 8, 2018, at UFC 231. He lost the fight via TKO in the first round.

Clark was expected to face Abdul-Kerim Edilov on April 20, 2019, at UFC Fight Night 149. However, Edilov's removal from the card for undisclosed reasons was announced on 25 March and he was replaced by Ivan Shtyrkov. However, on April 20, 2019, it was reported that the bout was cancelled after Shtyrkov was hospitalized.

Soon after the previous fight was canceled, it was announced that Clark would face Darko Stošić at UFC Fight Night: Gustafsson vs. Smith on June 1, 2019. He won the fight via unanimous decision.

Clark faced Ryan Spann on October 12, 2019, at UFC Fight Night 161. He lost the fight via submission in round two.

Clark was scheduled to face Gadzhimurad Antigulov on February 15, 2020, at UFC Fight Night 167. However, Antigulov was pulled from the event for undisclosed reason and he was replaced by Dequan Townsend. He won the fight by unanimous decision.

Clark was scheduled to face Alonzo Menifield on May 2, 2020, at UFC Fight Night: Hermansson vs. Weidman. However, on April 9, Dana White, the president of UFC announced that this event was postponed and the bout took place on June 6, 2020, at UFC 250. Clark won the fight via unanimous decision.

Clark was briefly linked to a bout against Shamil Gamzatov on November 28, 2020, at UFC on ESPN 18. However, Gamzatov was removed from the bout in mid-October due to alleged visa issues. Clark faced Anthony Smith on the card as the main event after Curtis Blaydes had to pull out of his fight against Derrick Lewis due to a positive COVID test. He lost the fight via a triangle choke submission in the first round.

Clark was scheduled to face Ion Cuțelaba on May 1, 2021, at UFC on ESPN 23. However, Clark pulled out from the event, citing injury, and he was replaced by Dustin Jacoby. The bout eventually took place on September 18, 2021, at UFC Fight Night 192. After being knocked down in round one, he lost the fight via unanimous decision.

Clark faced William Knight on on April 16, 2022, at UFC on ESPN 34. He won the fight via technical knockout in round three.

Clark faced Azamat Murzakanov on August 13, 2022, at UFC on ESPN 41. He lost the fight via technical knockout in round three.

Clark faced Da Un Jung on February 4, 2023, at UFC Fight Night 218. He won the fight via unanimous decision.

Clark is scheduled to face Kennedy Nzechukwu on May 6, 2023, at UFC 288.

Championships and accomplishments

Mixed martial arts
Resurrection Fighting Alliance 
Resurrection Fighting Alliance (RFA) Light heavyweight Champion (one time)

Personal life
When Clark was in high school at Lincoln, his two best friends gave him the moniker "Brown Bear", citing his dual personal characteristics - He has bear-like wrestling, and has a pleasant, thoughtful demeanor in everyday life. Clark is active in helping numerous non profit agencies in his community. He is especially involved in advocating for those that have Down syndrome and was recently appointed to the National Board of Garrett's Fight.

While training for his bout at UFC on Fox 24, Clark gained notice for advocating for Down syndrome awareness. Clark is very vocal in support of Down Syndrome Awareness and Advocacy, and the campaign to save the unborn Down Syndrome child from abortion.

Clark and his wife have a daughter.

Mixed martial arts record

|-
|Win
|align=center|14–7
|Da Un Jung
|Decision (unanimous)
|UFC Fight Night: Lewis vs. Spivak
|
|align=center|3
|align=center|5:00
|Las Vegas, Nevada, United States
|
|-
|Loss
|align=center|13–7
|Azamat Murzakanov
|TKO (punches)
|UFC on ESPN: Vera vs. Cruz
|
|align=center|3
|align=center|1:18
|San Diego, California, United States
|
|-
|Win
|align=center|13–6
|William Knight
|TKO (punches)
|UFC on ESPN: Luque vs. Muhammad 2
|
|align=center|3
|align=center|3:21
|Las Vegas, Nevada, United States
|
|-
|Loss
|align=center|12–6
|Ion Cuțelaba
|Decision (unanimous)
|UFC Fight Night: Smith vs. Spann 
|
|align=center|3
|align=center|5:00
|Las Vegas, Nevada, United States
|
|-
|Loss
|align=center|12–5
|Anthony Smith
|Submission (triangle choke)
|UFC on ESPN: Smith vs. Clark
|
|align=center|1
|align=center|2:34
|Las Vegas, Nevada, United States
|
|-
|Win
|align=center|12–4
|Alonzo Menifield
|Decision (unanimous)
|UFC 250
|
|align=center|3
|align=center|5:00
|Las Vegas, Nevada, United States
|
|-
|Win
|align=center|11–4
|Dequan Townsend
|Decision (unanimous)
|UFC Fight Night: Anderson vs. Błachowicz 2
|
|align=center|3
|align=center|5:00
|Rio Rancho, New Mexico, United States
|
|-
|Loss
|align=center|10–4
|Ryan Spann
|Submission (guillotine choke)
|UFC Fight Night: Joanna vs. Waterson
|
|align=center|2
|align=center|2:01
|Tampa, Florida, United States
|
|-
|Win
|align=center|10–3
|Darko Stošić 
|Decision (unanimous)
|UFC Fight Night: Gustafsson vs. Smith
|
|align=center|3
|align=center|5:00
|Stockholm, Sweden
|
|-
|Loss
|align=center|9–3
|Aleksandar Rakić
|TKO (punches)
|UFC 231
|
|align=center|1
|align=center|4:05
|Toronto, Ontario, Canada
|
|-
|Win
|align=center|9–2
|Mike Rodríguez
||Decision (unanimous)
|UFC 223
|
|align=center|3
|align=center|5:00
|Brooklyn, New York, United States
|
|-
|Loss
|align=center|8–2
|Jan Błachowicz
|Submission (standing rear-naked choke)
|UFC Fight Night: Cowboy vs. Till
|
|align=center|2
|align=center|3:02
|Gdańsk, Poland
|
|-
|Win
|align=center|8–1
|Jake Collier
|Decision (unanimous)
|UFC on Fox: Johnson vs. Reis
|
|align=center|3
|align=center|5:00
|Kansas City, Missouri, United States
|
|-
|Win
|align=center|7–1
|Josh Stansbury
|Decision (unanimous)
|The Ultimate Fighter: Tournament of Champions Finale
|
|align=center|3
|align=center|5:00
|Las Vegas, Nevada, United States
|
|-
|Loss
|align=center|6–1
|Alex Nicholson
|KO (punch)
|UFC Fight Night: McDonald vs. Lineker
|
|align=center|1
|align=center|4:57
|Sioux Falls, South Dakota, United States
|
|-
|Win
|align=center|6–0
|Rafael Viana
|TKO (hand injury)
|RFA 37
|
|align=center|2
|align=center|5:00
|Sioux Falls, South Dakota, United States
|
|-
|Win
|align=center|5–0
|Dervin Lopez
|Decision (unanimous)
|RFA 29
|
|align=center|3
|align=center|5:00
|Sioux Falls, South Dakota, United States
|
|-
|Win
|align=center|4–0
|Jaquis Williams
|Decision (unanimous)
|RFA 25
|
|align=center|3
|align=center|5:00
|Sioux Falls, South Dakota, United States
|
|-
|Win
|align=center|3–0
|William Vincent
|Submission (rear-naked choke)
|Total Fight Challenge
|
|align=center|1
|align=center|4:29
|Willow Springs, Illinois, United States
|
|-
|Win
|align=center|2–0
|Aaron Brown
|TKO (punches)
|RFA 17 
|
|align=center|2
|align=center|4:02
|Sioux Falls, South Dakota, United States
|
|-
|Win
|align=center|1–0
|Jeremy Spelts
|TKO (punches)
|Knockout Events: Battle at the Chip
|
|align=center|1
|align=center|1:12
|Sturgis, South Dakota, South Dakota
|

See also 
 List of current UFC fighters
 List of male mixed martial artists

References

External links 
  
 

1990 births
Living people
American male mixed martial artists
African-American mixed martial artists
Mixed martial artists from South Dakota
Light heavyweight mixed martial artists
Mixed martial artists utilizing boxing
Mixed martial artists utilizing collegiate wrestling
Ultimate Fighting Championship male fighters
American male sport wrestlers
African-American sport wrestlers
Amateur wrestlers
American male boxers
African-American boxers
Boxers from South Dakota
21st-century African-American sportspeople
People from Sioux Falls, South Dakota